Swan Lee is a Danish band featuring Pernille Rosendahl on vocals. It was formed in 1996 by Rosendahl with guitarist Jonas Struck, drummer Emil Jørgensen and keyboardist Tim Christensen, who was her boyfriend at the time. The name was taken from a Syd Barrett song.

History

Early years
Although Christensen was enjoying great successes as frontman of the band Dizzy Mizz Lizzy at the time, struggles surrounding the recording of their 1996 album Rotator caused him to turn to Rosendahl in and out of the studio. Although Rosendahl was a major support for him during this time, his absence also further added to the crisis and caused Christensen to become increasingly estranged from the other two band members, who even went as far as labeling the couple as "John and Yoko", referring to the supposed detrimental influence of Yoko Ono on John Lennon that contributed to the break-up of the Beatles. When Dizzy Mizz Lizzy ultimately broke up in 1998, Christensen became even more introverted, and his crisis was too much for Rosendahl to handle, resulting in the couple to break up after five years and causing Christensen to depart the band in 1999.

Enter (2001)
The remaining trio renamed the band Swan Lee, and bassist Frederik Damsgaard joined the group. 

An entire album was recorded with Cannibal Records, but never released because of musical differences with the record label director Kim Hyttel, followed by lawsuits. Other record companies rejected them seeing a potential only in Rosendahl.

The band eventually decided to establish their own record label, named GoGo Records, and in February 2001 released their debut album Enter, which sold 20,000 copies and peaked at position 27 in the Danish charts. Christensen, who had also produced Rosendahl's 1997 demo Dream Away, wrote arrangements for and played several instruments on some of Swan Lee's early songs.

"Tomorrow Never Dies"
Christensen and Rosendahl entered into the James Bond Tomorrow Never Dies soundtrack contest by co-writing a song of the same name. Their submission was rejected, in favour of the song submitted by Sheryl Crow. The song "Tomorrow Never Dies" that was previously submitted to the contest, was released as a single. Tomorrow Never Dies was featured in Danish IO Interactive's videogame Hitman: Blood Money.

Swan Lee (2004)
In 2004, the band released the self-titled Swan Lee, which reached number one in the charts. 

The single "I Don't Mind" peaked at position three.

Disbanding
Swan Lee disbanded in September 2005.

Discography

Albums

Single

References

External links
Swan Lee website
Gogo Records website

Danish musical groups